The British Academy Television Craft Award for Best Writer: Comedy is one of the categories presented by the British Academy of Film and Television Arts (BAFTA) within the British Academy Television Craft Awards, the craft awards were established in 2000 with their own, separate ceremony as a way to spotlight technical achievements, without being overshadowed by the main production categories.

Prior to 2013, there was a united category named Best Writer for both drama and comedy series, in 2013 this category was split into two separate categories, Writer: Drama and Writer: Comedy''.

Winners and nominees

2010s

2020s

See also
 British Academy Television Craft Award for Best Writer: Drama
 Primetime Emmy Award for Outstanding Writing for a Comedy Series

References

External links
 

Writer: Comedy